The Troubles in Rock recounts incidents during, and the effects of, The Troubles in Rock, County Tyrone, Northern Ireland.

Incidents in Rock during the Troubles resulting in two or more fatalities:

1975
10 February 1975 - Arthur Mulholland (65) and Eugene Doyle (18), both Catholic civilians, were shot dead at Hayden's Bar, Rock, during an Ulster Volunteer Force gun attack which was later linked to the "Glenanne gang".

Links 
NI Conflict Archive on the Internet

Rock